Shock Stop is a system developed by sports equipment manufacturer Head to damp (reduce) vibration in its range of titanium tennis rackets. It works by drawing the vibration down the frame of the racket into the handle, where a ball-bearing balanced mechanism absorbs the shock.

Technology
Head's latest vibration dampening system is EDS (Electronic Dampening System) which is being implemented into the newer rackets, such as the HEAD Protector. It works by using piezoelectric fibers, which convert mechanical into electronic energy, controlled by a microchip. EDS recognizes the damping mode and electronically creates a cancelling counter vibration. This reduces shock impact by more than 50% and residual vibrations twice as fast as in a conventional racquet period.

External links
 Head website

Tennis equipment